The 2012–13 Telemach League was the 22nd season of the Premier A Slovenian Basketball League, the highest professional basketball league in Slovenia.
The first half of the season consisted of 10 teams and a 90-game regular season (18 games for each of the 10 teams) and began on Saturday, 20 October 2012. The second half of the season consisted of two teams from the Adriatic League and the best four teams from first half of the season.

Teams for the 2012–13 season

Regular season

Champions standings

P=Matches played, W=Matches won, L=Matches lost, F=Points for, A=Points against, Pts=Points

Relegation league

P=Matches played, W=Matches won, L=Matches lost, F=Points for, A=Points against, Pts=Points

Playoffs

Finals

Awards

Regular Season MVP
  Dejan Mlakar (Slovan)

Season MVP
  Kervin Bristol (Hopsi Polzela)

Finals MVP
  Matjaž Smodiš (Krka)

Weekly MVP

Regular season

Note

 – Co-MVP's were announced.

Second round

Statistics leaders 

| width=50% valign=top |

Points

|}
|}

| width=50% valign=top |

Assists

 

|}
|}

References

External links
Official Basketball Federation of Slovenia website 

Slovenian Basketball League seasons
Slovenia
1